Hugo Borst (born 15 June 1962, Rotterdam) is a Dutch writer, editor, TV personality and critic (best known for his football critiques).

Career
Borst finished school when he was 18, the so-called havo. Although he never played professional football, he became a journalist
for the magazine Voetbal International in 1985. After working for Voetbal International for six years he started to write for another magazine, Panorama. He did that for three years only. He now writes columns for the Algemeen Dagblad (mostly about Football) as well for the magazine Esquire, about love and sex. He also is one of the main editors for the soccermagazine Hard Gras. 

Borst also appeared on Dutch television. An avid Sparta Rotterdam supporter, he was a regular guest in the soccer discussion program Studio Voetbal as well as regular guest in the current affairs program De Wereld Draait Door. 
He also presented his own television program, Over Vaders en Zonen. In this show Borst examines issues of raising autistic children, a topic to which he was drawn due to his experiences with his own autistic son.

In 2011, Borst ceased all writing and television activities, claiming he was mentally exhausted.

During the 2014 World Cup Borst is appearing on Nederland 1's "Studio Brasil" as a pundit.

Books
De Coolsingel bleef leeg (1996)
Over vaders en zonen (2005)
Het grote, gezellige voetbalquizboek voor het hele gezin (2006)
Over lust en liefde. Verhaaltjes voor het slapengaan (als men niets beters te doen heeft natuurlijk) (2007)
Schieten op Volkert van der G. De beste voetbalverhalen (2008)
Over vaders en zonen. Een controversieel verhaal over de verboden liefde tussen een vader en zijn zoon (2008)
Alle ballen op Heintje (2009)
Waarom ik zo van Sparta hou (2010)
Kappen (2011)
O, Louis (2014)
Ma. Hugo Borst over zijn dementerende moeder. (2015)
Ach, moedertje. Vervolg op het boek Ma. (2017)

References

1962 births
Living people
Mass media people from Rotterdam
Autism activists
Dutch association football commentators
Dutch biographers
Dutch columnists
Dutch critics
Dutch magazine editors
Dutch male writers
Dutch sports journalists
Dutch sportswriters
Dutch television presenters
Male biographers